Pandit Vijay Raghav Rao (born Vijaya Raghava Rao; 3 November 1925 – 30 November 2011) was an Indian flutist, composer, choreographer, musicologist, poet and fiction writer.

He was awarded the Padma Shri by Government of India in 1970, and in 1982 the Sangeet Natak Akademi in Creative and Experimental music category, the highest for performing artist conferred by the Sangeet Natak Akademi, India's National Academy for Music, Dance and Drama.

Personal life
He was born in Madras (now Chennai), India. He was married since 1947 to Smt. Lakshmi V. Rao. They had four children, nine grandchildren and one great-grandchild. He was an Indian-American, a permanent resident of the United States.

References

External links
 http://www.feenotes.com/db/artists/r/raovijayraghav.php
 http://www.themusicmagazine.com/vijayraghav.html
 

1925 births
Hindustani instrumentalists
Indian musicologists
Indian choreographers
Indian flautists
Musicians from Chennai
Recipients of the Sangeet Natak Akademi Award
Indian film score composers
Recipients of the Padma Shri in arts
2011 deaths
20th-century Indian composers
Indian male film score composers
20th-century male musicians
20th-century flautists